Atanas Komchev (23 October 1959 – 12 November 1994) was a Bulgarian wrestler and Olympic champion.

He became Olympic champion in 1988 in the Greco-Roman light heavyweight class. He received three silver medals and two bronze medals in the FILA Wrestling World Championships. Komchev was in an automobile accident on 2 November 1994 and died 10 days later, on 12 November.

References

External links
 

1959 births
People from Karnobat
Wrestlers at the 1988 Summer Olympics
Wrestlers at the 1992 Summer Olympics
Bulgarian male sport wrestlers
Olympic gold medalists for Bulgaria
1994 deaths
Olympic medalists in wrestling
World Wrestling Championships medalists
Medalists at the 1988 Summer Olympics
Road incident deaths in Bulgaria
20th-century Bulgarian people